David Fonseca (born on 14 June 1973, in Leiria) is a Portuguese musician, singer-songwriter and photographer. As a musician, he plays several instruments, including acoustic guitar and organ. He is recognized for his successful music career as a member of Silence 4 and, since 2003, as a solo artist. He is also responsible for the graphic design on his album covers and the art direction on his videoclips. Between 2004 and 2006, he was also part of the Humanos tribute project.

Beginnings
David Fonseca studied cinema at the Lisbon Theatre and Film School (Escola Superior de Teatro e Cinema) where he attained a bachelor's degree. He also attended Escola Superior de Belas Artes de Lisboa between 1992 and 1994. David began his professional life as a photographer, working for various fashion catalogues. He participated in many exhibitions, both group and individual. He also worked in a radio station for a while. David Fonseca has dedicated his life to his love of music choosing to become a pop/rock alternative musician. He has multiple musical influences such as Sérgio Godinho, Jeff Buckley, The B-52's, Pixies, Roy Orbison, Aphex Twin and Ryan Adams, all of whom had a huge role in his musical creativity and individuality. He also mentioned in an interview with radio station "Antena 3" that he has an addiction to the group Yeah Yeah Yeahs. David has a son and a daughter from a first marriage. On December 27, 2019, married the model, actress, and presenter Ana Sofia Martins.

Career

Silence 4

Fonseca's musical career started with a band called Silence 4, formed by a group of hometown friends.  They first released the unpredictable Silence Becomes It, in June 1998 that was a huge success at the time, selling 250,000 copies (the equivalent to six platinum records). This was a remarkable achievement in the Portuguese musical scene, where it is usually difficult to sell these many copies. The album has only two songs written in Portuguese. One of them is "Sexto Sentido", featuring the popular Portuguese singer, Sérgio Godinho. To complete this great year for the band, which played at most of the Portuguese Summer festivals, they closed the world-famous exhibition Expo '98 in Lisbon, playing for about 50 thousand people.  Later in the same year, in December, Silence 4 was the first national band to sell out at Pavilhão Atlântico, performing to an astonishing 18,000-strong crowd, only 6 months after the release of their first album. Two years after the "phenomenon" the second album was released, Only Pain Is Real, in July 2000, selling approximately 100,000 copies to this day. The respective tour ended in a double concert at the legendary stage in the Portuguese capital of Lisbon, the Coliseu dos Recreios, which sold out completely and was released later on in CD and in DVD format. Throughout 2000, Silence 4 went on their last tour. In 2001, the band entered an undetermined hiatus, that still remains.

Solo career
Fonseca's solo career kicked off the 21st century with a different sound from Silence 4. In his first solo work Sing Me Something New, recorded in 2003, Fonseca sang and played nearly all the instruments, exploring a totally new environment of sounds on his own. The album was recorded in the studios of producer Mário Barreiros, and later in the Sterling Sound Studios in New York City, by the well-known sound engineer, George Marino, who participated in some of the recordings of Coldplay, the Rollins Band, The Dandy Warhols and Sepultura, among many others. The first single was Someone That Cannot Love which debuted on about 150 Portuguese radio stations in a coordinated release: they were all played on 10 March at midnight. It soon reached #2 on the National Sales Chart and was certified Gold. The tour supporting this first record was extensive; it included many big music venues and large festivals across Portugal.

Our Hearts Will Beat As One, his second solo album, is said by Fonseca himself to be "scarily personal" and was only released in the fall of 2005 because of the other projects that Fonseca was involved in between his two albums. The first single was Who Are U?, described by Fonseca as "the song I always wanted to write". It reached No. 3 on the Portuguese charts. Our Hearts Will Beat As One was critically acclaimed by the media and was considered pop album of the year in Portugal, even before the end of the year. The album went straight to No. 1 on the National Sales Chart and reached Gold status on its first week of sales.

In October 2007, his third original album, Dreams in Colour, was released and the first single was Superstars II, a song that obtained substantial airplay due to a cellphone campaign that adopted the single.

In July 2009, the first single ("A Cry 4 Love") was finally released to the public. The new album, Between Waves, was out on 2 November 2009. On the same day, Fonseca's online community, Amazing Cats Club started working.

Fonseca's fourth album entitled Seasons:Rising was released 21 March 2012. The first single What Life Is For came up on 4 February 2012.

Humanos

In 2004, David joined a new project called Humanos. The idea behind it was to record some unpublished songs by the famous Portuguese artist, a singer-songwriter, from the 1980s, António Variações. David Fonseca, Manuela Azevedo (the lead singer of another Portuguese music group, Clã), Camané (one of the most famous Portuguese "fadistas"), Sérgio Nascimento (a member of Sérgio Godinho’s band), Hélder Gonçalves (also from Clã), Nuno Rafael and João Cardoso are the seven members of a group that would become a huge success, something unseen in the Portuguese music scene. The eponymous album scored an impressive quintuple platinum, staying for weeks at No. 1. "Muda de Vida", "Maria Albertina" and "Rugas" are just some of the group's hits.

All this culminated in three sold-out concerts, two of them in "Coliseu dos Recreios" (Lisbon) and the other in Porto. There was also another memorable performance, in front of a crowd of 40,000 people, at the "Sudoeste" Portuguese Festival, in the year 2005. The Humanos were always intended to be a short project, because there were few unpublished António Variações’ songs. Thus, the CD and DVD with the recorded Coliseums’ live concerts, which was released in November 2006, marked the end of the Humanos project.

Live concerts
David Fonseca is known by his powerful dancing on stage, equipped with his pair of Chuck Taylor All-Stars. He plays different instruments during the show and he is accompanied by his band, which includes: Sérgio Nascimento (drummer), Ricardo Fiel (guitarist), Rita Redshoes (ex-Atomic Bees in the piano and also voices; the second record single "Hold Still" is a David and Rita duet), Nuno Simões (bass player) and Paulo Pereira (hammond). David does not just play his solo-career hits but also lesser-known tracks. He also plays (in most of his live concerts) "Angel Song", the first music he wrote, composed when he was only 18 and which was included in Silence 4's first album. This theme is perhaps the one most loved among fans, of the group or of David. In the middle of the show, he usually leaves the stage to return wearing a white suit, to announce that "dancing time" has begun and that the "moonwalk" move is near.

Discography

Studio albums
as part of Silence 4
1998: Silence Becomes It
2000: Only Pain Is Real

as part of Humanos
2004: Humanos

Solo

Others

Christmas CDs

Live albums
as part of Silence 4
2004: Ao Vivo - Coliseu dos Recreios
2014: SongBook Live 2014

as part of Humanos
2006: Humanos Ao Vivo

solo

Compilation albums

DVDs
2008: Dreams in Colour Live
2009: Streets of Lisbon - Acoustic Live Sessions (Bonus-DVD with Between Waves CD)
2011: Christmas 2011 DVD [Between Waves Tour @ Coliseu do Porto]

Singles

Collaborations
David Fonseca has also collaborated with many other artists, such as Trovante and Sérgio Godinho.
In 1999 he travelled to England to work with producer Darren Allison on the Phase song "City" from their album 52 Minutes of Your Time.
Fonseca took part alongside many other Portuguese artists in the music video of "Encosta-te a mim" by Jorge Palma.

Books published
2012: Right Here, Right Now

Filmography
1996: Gel Fatal (director of photography)
2002: Esquece Tudo O Que Te Disse: David/Jovem no Karaoke (cameo appearance)
2005: Lastro (Composer)
2008: Os Contemporâneos: Ele Próprio (sketch: Videoclip for "Salvem os Ricos")
2010: Gru – O Maldisposto as Vector (voice actor)

References

External links

1973 births
Living people
People from Leiria
Portuguese pop singers
21st-century Portuguese male singers
Silence 4 members
Portuguese male singer-songwriters
English-language singers from Portugal
20th-century Portuguese male singers
Lisbon Theatre and Film School alumni